Chromobox protein homolog 2 is a protein that in humans is encoded by the CBX2 gene.

Interactions 

CBX2 (gene) has been shown to interact with RYBP.

References

External links

Further reading